Sinclair is a high school in the Swedish city of Uddevalla. The school carries four art-based educations; Music, Art, Dance and theatre; as well as a media education. Though there are different directions of education, the students are free to take courses pertaining to the different specializations and are even encouraged to do so as the art-genres have a course mainly for that purpose.

Location 

The school itself is located in the former locales of the popular clothing brand Tiger of Sweden and is named after the first mayor of Uddevalla. The school is also a part of Uddevalla Gymnasieskola which is a cooperation between the high schoolhouses of Uddevalla.

References 

Schools in Sweden